Elwood N. Williams (November 12, 1842March 8, 1921) was an American recipient of the Medal of Honor for actions during the American Civil War.

Biography 
Elwood Williams was born November 12, 1842 in Philadelphia, Pennsylvania. He fought as a private in the 28th Illinois Infantry Regiment. He participated in the Battle of Shiloh, which is where he earned his medal on April 6, 1862. His medal was presented to him on September 28, 1897. He died on March 8, 1921, and is now buried in West Laurel Hill Cemetery, Bala-Cynwyd, Pennsylvania.

Medal of Honor citation

References 

1842 births
1921 deaths
American Civil War recipients of the Medal of Honor